Nicholas Hawkins of Cardiff was a Welsh Member of Parliament. He represented Cardiff Boroughs in 1597.

References

Year of birth missing
Year of death missing
Politicians from Cardiff
16th-century Welsh politicians
English MPs 1597–1598